Andrzej Stelmachowski (28 January 1925, Poznań – 6 April 2009, Warsaw) was a Polish academic and politician.

Life
Stelmachowski was a member of Armia Krajowa, the Polish resistance during Second World War. A lawyer, professor of University of Wrocław (from 1962) and University of Warsaw (from 1967), he was a Solidarity advisor in 1980 and took part in the Polish Round Table Agreement. He also served as Marshal of the Senate (1989–1991), Minister of Education (1991–1992), and presidential advisor from (2007–2009).  In his advisory capacity he suggested doing away with the secrecy of the Union of Solidarity; his idea was to "break away" and "create open structures as much as possible".

Stelmachowski was the founder and then president of Stowarzyszenie "Wspólnota Polska", serving until 11 May 2008.

Stelmachowski died on 6 April 2009. The Polish President Lech Kaczynski expressed his condolences to family and friends as did politicians from across the political spectrum in Poland, representatives of Polish emigrant organizations in Belarus, Lithuania and United States.

See also
List of Poles

References

1925 births
2009 deaths
Politicians from Poznań
Home Army members
Senat Marshals
Members of the Senate of Poland 1989–1991
Education ministers of Poland
Academic staff of the University of Białystok
Academic staff of the University of Warsaw
Polish Round Table Talks participants
Recipients of the Order of the White Eagle (Poland)